Spanga is a village in Weststellingwerf in the province of Friesland, the Netherlands. It had a population of around 210 in 2017.

The village was first mentioned in 1320 as Spangghe. The etymology is unclear. The Dutch Reformed church was demolished in 1831. In 1851, a bell tower was erected as its replacement. The tower was destroyed during a storm in 1954, and a new tower was built in 1955 which was replaced in 1989.

Spanga was home to 121 people in 1840.

Gallery

References

External links

Geography of Weststellingwerf
Populated places in Friesland